Antoine Castonguay (June 14, 1881 – May 11, 1959) was a politician in Quebec, Canada and a Member of the Legislative Assembly of Quebec (MLA).

Early life

He was born on June 14, 1881, near Kamouraska, Bas-Saint-Laurent.

Mayor

Castonguay served as Mayor of Saint-Félicien in Saguenay-Lac-Saint-Jean from 1935 to 1940.

Member of the legislature

He ran as an Action libérale nationale candidate in the district of Roberval in the 1935 provincial election and won. Castonguay joined Maurice Duplessis's Union Nationale and was re-elected in 1936. He was defeated by Liberal candidate Georges Potvin in 1939.

Death

He died on May 11, 1959, in Chicoutimi.

References

1881 births
1959 deaths
Action libérale nationale MNAs
Mayors of places in Quebec
Union Nationale (Quebec) MNAs
People from Bas-Saint-Laurent